Christopher Andrew Gocong (born November 16, 1983) is a former American football linebacker who played for the Philadelphia Eagles and Cleveland Browns in the National Football League. He was drafted by the Philadelphia Eagles in the third round of the 2006 NFL Draft. He played college football at FCS Cal Poly in San Luis Obispo, CA.

Early years
Gocong attended Carpinteria High School in Carpinteria, California and was a letterman in football as a quarterback and linebacker. He also lettered in track and field. In football, as a linebacker, he posted 330 tackles over two years. In track and field, he was a two-time All-League honoree in the discus and shot put and set the school record in the discus (183' 3") in his junior year. Gocong was a two-time All-Tri-Valley League linebacker in football and a two-time All-CIF-Southern Section linebacker.

College career
Gocong played college football at Cal Poly where he won the 2005 Buck Buchanan Award as college football's best I-AA defensive player, garnering 44 first-place ballots and 359 total voting points. 

He saw limited action in six games during the 2001 season at Cal Poly, recording six tackles (three solo). He then redshirted in 2002 and started the 2003 campaign as the team's nose guard. Gocong totaled 37 tackles (20 solo) with a sack and eight stops for losses that year.

In 2005, Gocong set a Division I-AA single-season record with 23.5 sacks and led the nation with 31 tackles behind the line of scrimmage. He recorded a career-high 98 tackles, caused four fumbles, recovered two others and deflected four passes. He was voted a unanimous All-American.

In 41 career games with the Mustangs, Gocong started 35 times. He recorded 212 tackles as he set an NCAA career record with 42 sacks for minus-284 yards. His 61.5 stops for losses of 330 yards rank fourth in Division I-AA history. He recovered three fumbles and caused six others. He also intercepted a pass, deflected eight others and blocked a kick.

Gocong graduated from the university with a degree in biomedical engineering. He was inducted into the Cal Poly Hall of Fame in 2022 as part of the Mustangs' first class to be enshrined following return from the COVID-19 pandemic.

Professional career

Pre-draft

Philadelphia Eagles
Gocong was drafted in the third round of the 2006 NFL Draft by the Philadelphia Eagles, but missed the entire 2006 season due to an injury suffered before the preseason. He made his NFL debut on September 9, 2007, where he started at the "Sam" linebacker position. He alternated snaps at defensive end and linebacker and recorded his first career sack (Tom Brady) on November 25, 2007, in the Eagles' road game at the New England Patriots. In all, Gocong played in all 16 games serving as the team's SAM linebacker, and recorded 92 tackles, one sack, four hurries and two passed defended. His seven tackles-for-losses ranked second on the team. Also recorded 11 special teams tackles. During the 2007 season, Gocong was the host of the Chris Gocong Show on ESPN 1450. The show was hosted by Mike Gill, live from Chickie's and Pete's in Egg Harbor Township, New Jersey.

In 2008 he finished tied for third on the team in special teams tackles with 19. He also had 61 total tackles, two sacks, four passes defensed a forced fumble and a fumble recovery as the Eagles starting strongside linebacker.

In the first seven games of the 2009 season, Gocong started at his normal position at "Sam" linebacker. He was inactive in week 8 against the Dallas Cowboys due to a hamstring injury suffered the week before against the New York Giants. Due to injuries at the middle linebacker position, Gocong started his first game at middle linebacker against San Diego in week 9. In week 14, he lost his starting "Sam" linebacker job to rookie Moise Fokou.

He was re-signed to a one-year contract on March 30, 2010.

Cleveland Browns
On April 2, 2010, Gocong was traded, along with cornerback Sheldon Brown to the Cleveland Browns in exchange for linebacker Alex Hall, and 4th and 5th round draft picks in the 2010 NFL Draft. On August 4, 2012, during a training camp practice, Gocong was lost for the 2012 season due to a right Achilles tendon rupture that required surgery.

NFL statistics

Key
 GP: games played
 COMB: combined tackles
 TOTAL: total tackles
 AST: assisted tackles
 SACK: sacks
 FF: forced fumbles
 FR: fumble recoveries 
 FR YDS: fumble return yards
 INT: interceptions
 IR YDS: interception return yards
 AVG IR: average interception return
 LNG: longest interception return
 TD: interceptions returned for touchdown
 PD: passes defensed

Artistry 
Post-football, Gocong became an accomplished painter. In the fall of 2022, his work was displayed at Kate Oh Gallery's "Let There Be Light" exhibit on Madison Avenue in New York.

References

External links

Philadelphia Eagles bio

1983 births
Living people
American football defensive ends
American football outside linebackers
Cal Poly Mustangs football players
Philadelphia Eagles players
Cleveland Browns players
People from Carpinteria, California
Sportspeople from Santa Barbara County, California
Players of American football from California